Iarnród Éireann or Irish Rail, is the operator of the national railway network of Ireland. Established on 2 February 1987, it is a subsidiary of Córas Iompair Éireann (CIÉ). It operates all internal InterCity, Commuter, DART and freight railway services in the Republic of Ireland, and, jointly with Northern Ireland Railways, the Enterprise service between Dublin and Belfast. In 2019, IÉ carried 50 million passengers, up from 48 million in 2018, and a record peak.

Until 2013 Ireland was the only European Union state that had not implemented EU Directive 91/440 and related legislation, having derogated from its obligation to split train operations and infrastructure businesses, and allow open access by private companies to the rail network. A consultation on the restructuring of Iarnród Éireann took place in 2012. The derogation ended on 14 March 2013 when the company was split in 2 sectors: Railway Undertaking and Infrastructure Manager.

Organisation 
At the time of its establishment, the company referred to itself as Irish Rail and adopted the four rails IR logo. In 1994, the company brought the Irish form of its name to the fore, introducing a logo and corporate branding based on the letters IÉ (Iarnród Éireann) branding and logo. Both languages remained part of the official company name ("Iarnród Éireann – Irish Rail"). In January 2013, a new logo was introduced with a new bilingual branding; it made its first appearance in early January on online timetables, before officially launching on the 21st. In late 2013 the logo was updated again with a new font.

Operationally, services are divided across four regional areas:
 Northern and Eastern services are managed from Connolly (including Sligo in the North-West)
 Southern and Western services are managed from Heuston

Services

Passenger services 
IÉ's passenger services are branded under three main names; InterCity, Commuter and DART.

InterCity 

InterCity services are long-distance routes radiating mainly from Dublin. The Belfast – Dublin service, jointly operated with Northern Ireland Railways, is branded separately as Enterprise. Dublin's two main InterCity stations are Connolly and Heuston. Intercity services run to/from Cork, Limerick, Tralee, Ennis, Galway, Waterford, Rosslare Europort, Sligo, Westport, Wexford and Ballina. Dublin's third major station, Pearse, is the terminus for much of the suburban network in the Greater Dublin area. An additional InterCity service runs from Limerick to Waterford. This service formerly operated through to Rosslare Europort but services between Waterford and Rosslare Europort ceased after the last train on 18 September 2010. Bus Éireann now operates route 370 through the affected towns as replacement transport.

A new service began on 29 March 2010 from Limerick to Galway, as part of the Western Rail Corridor, reopening the long-closed line.

A January 2012 national newspaper article suggested that Iarnród Éireann was expected to seek permission in the near future from the National Transport Authority to close the Limerick–Ballybrophy railway line and the Limerick–Waterford line.

Commuter 

The majority of Commuter services are based in Dublin, which has four commuter routes: Northern (to Drogheda MacBride), Western (Connolly Station or Docklands to Kilcock/M3 Parkway), South-Western (to Sallins and Naas Railway Station) and South-Eastern (to Kilcoole). See Dublin Suburban Rail for more details. 
The Cork Suburban Rail currently has three Commuter services: to Mallow and Cobh, and a third service to Midleton which became operational on a part of the disused Youghal branch line on 30 July 2009. 
Limerick Suburban Rail currently consists of two lines to Ennis and Nenagh, with shuttle services to Limerick Junction. A Commuter service operates between Galway to Oranmore and Athenry.

Commuter trains also operate on shuttle duty for branches from the main InterCity services from Mallow to Tralee (off the Dublin – Cork route) and from Manulla Junction to Ballina (off the Dublin – Westport route), as well as acting as InterCity trains for Dublin – Rosslare and some Dublin – Sligo services, and as the aforementioned Limerick – Limerick Junction – Waterford service.

DART 

The north–south route along Dublin's eastern coastal side is also host to DART, Ireland's only electrified heavy-rail service. The DART consists of many types of trains, the oldest and most famous one being the 8100 Class which still operates, now extensively refurbished.

Services Table

The following is a simplified table of Monday - Friday off-peak services, various irregular calling patterns have been omitted for clarity.

Freight services 
Iarnród Éireann also has responsibility for running freight services on the Irish network through its Freight Division – which recorded a tonnage decrease of 19.2% in 2019, and as of 2020, there are 3 freight flows running throughout the country. This operates both Railfreight trains and a network of road haulage through various distribution nodes throughout the country. Iarnród Éireann Freight is subdivided into three sections:
Bulk Freight – specialises in operating full trainloads of freight, usually bulk movements of single products such as cement, mineral ore or timber.
Intermodal – container trains, currently operated between Waterford Port and Ballina and Dublin Port and Ballina.
Navigator – the freight forwarding division, particularly associated with the transport of automotive stock parts.

Operational details 

The Enterprise route (Dublin to Belfast) is well regarded. However, it is only double track and serves both local and intermediate Commuter as well as InterCity traffic. Hence any delay has knock-on effects. Also, there is limited platform availability at Connolly Station in Dublin. There was also a persistent problem with engine overloading, as Enterprise locomotives also supplied coach power. However, since September 2012, additional power is provided by separate Mark 3 generator vans.

The Cork-Dublin route was formerly the "premier line" of the Great Southern and Western Railway, one of the biggest pre-CIÉ operators. Rolling stock on this route consists of Mark 4 trains, which were built in Spain, complete with DVTs for faster turn-around. 22000 Class DMUs built in South Korea came into service from early 2007 replacing older coaching stock on most other InterCity routes. These 183 carriages are described by the company as the "Greenest diesel trains in Europe".

The former Minister for Transport, Noel Dempsey TD had announced that an additional 51 railcars had been ordered for the company for a planned introduction on services between Dublin, Louth, and Meath. They were placed into service in 2011/2012 but this plan was badly affected by the recession with 21 surpluses to requirements at the end of 2012.

The maximum operational speed of InterCity trains on the IÉ rail network is 160 km/h (100 mph), although the design speed of the Mark 4 carriages is 201 km/h (125 mph).

Since 2019, Irish Rail has been trying to recruit more female drivers.

1916 station renaming 

Although the majority of Iarnród Éireann's stations are simply named after the towns they serve, a number of stations in major towns and cities were renamed after leaders of the 1916 Easter Rising, on its 50th Anniversary in 1966:
Dublin Connolly (formerly Amiens Street)
Dublin Heuston (formerly Kingsbridge)
Dublin Pearse (formerly Westland Row)
Dún Laoghaire Mallin
Bray Daly
Cork Kent (formerly Glanmire Road)
Kilkenny MacDonagh
Limerick Colbert
Tralee Casement
Dundalk Clarke
Drogheda MacBride
Sligo Mac Diarmada
Galway Ceannt
Waterford Plunkett
Wexford O'Hanrahan

Network Catering 
IÉ's Network Catering unit used to provide a trolley service of food and drink, a snack car and (on some routes) a restaurant service. It also operated a restaurant at Dún Laoghaire. According to Iarnród Éireann's annual report, the unit lost €297,000 in 2004. In 2006, Iarnród Éireann outsourced the catering on the Dublin-Belfast service to Corporate Catering Ltd, and all InterCity services were taken over by Rail Gourmet in March 2007. Rail Gourmet later withdrew from the contract and no longer provides catering for any Irish Rail services.

Rolling stock 

The company has a fleet size consisting of 547 carriages (excluding the Enterprise service):
InterCity services have a fleet of 265 carriages.
Commuter services have a fleet of 148 carriages.
DART services have a fleet of 134 carriages.
Dublin-Belfast Enterprise has a fleet of 28 carriages.

InterCity and Enterprise fleet 
IE 201 Class Locomotive
IE 22000 Class DMU
Mark 4
De Dietrich Rolling stock

Locomotive fleet

Current 
CIE 071 Class locomotive
IE 201 Class locomotive

Former 
CIE 001 Class locomotive
CIE 201 Class locomotive 
CIE 121 Class locomotive
CIE 141 Class locomotive
CIE 181 Class locomotive

Commuter fleet

Current 
IE 2600 Class DMU
IE 2800 Class DMU
IE 29000 Class DMU
IE 22000 Class DMU

Former 
IE 2700 Class DMU
IE 2750 Class DMU
IE 8200 Class EMU

DART fleet

Current 
CIÉ 8100 Class EMU
IE 8500 Class EMU
IE 8510 Class EMU
IE 8520 Class EMU

Former 
IE 8200 Class EMU

Future fleet
IÉ's increasing fleet usage has led to requirements being made for the procurement of additional vehicles. DART services are running with all trains formed of 4–8 cars, while 54 sets of 63 fleet of ICRs are committed to services with 56 required on Friday. To this end, IÉ plans to purchase a significant number of new ICR vehicles – an initial purchase of 41 will be made for delivery in 2021, comprising three new trains, with the remainder planned as intermediate vehicles to lengthen existing units. The deal for the new vehicles is intended to include options for up to 40 further vehicles. There are also plans for a total replacement of the existing DART fleet, which will be combined with extensions to the DART network. The framework for the DART fleet is planned for up to 600 vehicles formed into four-car and eight-car sets, split into both pure EMU and BEMU trains. For immediate fleet capacity increases, IÉ planned refurbishment of its 2700 Class DMUs, which was subsequently cancelled. Instead, IÉ is discussing the possibility of sourcing surplus DMUs from the British network, with s and s available.

See also 
 List of Irish companies
 List of railway stations in Ireland
 History of rail transport in Ireland
 Transport in Ireland
 Diesel Locomotives of Ireland
 Multiple Units of Ireland
 Coaching Stock of Ireland

References

External links 

 Irish Rail Official Site – Timetables, bookings, operations, and corporate site
 Irish Railway Record Society
 Eiretrains – Irish Railways Past & Present

 
CIÉ
1987 establishments in Ireland
Irish brands
Rail transport in the Republic of Ireland
Rail transport in Northern Ireland
Passenger rail transport in Northern Ireland
Railway companies of the Republic of Ireland
Railway companies of the United Kingdom
Department of Transport (Ireland)